Australian White or Australian white may refer to:

 Australian White Ensign, an ensign used by ships of the Royal Australian Navy
 Australian white ibis (Threskiornis molucca), a species of a wading bird of the ibis family, Threskiornithidae
 Australian White sheep, a livestock breed
 Australian White rabbit (disambiguation), a livestock breed and several things named for it

See also
 White Australian (disambiguation)